Alberta Provincial Highway No. 15, commonly referred to as Highway 15 or Manning Drive, is a highway in the Edmonton Region of Alberta, connecting northeast Edmonton to the City of Fort Saskatchewan and communities within Lamont County.  It serves as an alternative to Highway 16 that bypasses Elk Island National Park.  The highway follows the route of a railway line completed in 1905 by the Canadian Northern Railway.  In Edmonton, the most southerly portion of the route is named Fort Road, followed by Manning Drive to the north, a developing freeway.

Highway 15 is designated as a core route of Canada's National Highway System, between Highway 16 and the intersection with Highway 28A within Edmonton and is part of the Edmonton-Fort McMurray corridor.

Route description
The highway begins at the intersection of 50 Street and Highway 16 (Yellowhead Trail) in Edmonton. It proceeds north along 50 Street to Manning Drive, where it diverts northeast before passing over Anthony Henday Drive (Highway 216). Before leaving Edmonton, Highway 15 continues northeast past the southern terminus of Highway 28A. Within Sturgeon County, it intersects with the eastern terminus of Highway 37 and then turns southeast to cross the North Saskatchewan River and intersect with the northern terminus of Highway 21 in the City of Fort Saskatchewan. From this junction, Highway 15 travels northeast again and then east, intersecting with Highway 45 and Highway 29. It then turns southeast and passes through the towns of Lamont and Mundare. At the outskirts of Mundare, it begins a  concurrency with Highway 855 before ending at Highway 16.

Twinning

A significant portion of Highway 15 between Fort Saskatchewan and Edmonton is currently only two lanes. This has caused headaches for local commuters; more than 23,000 vehicles cross the bridge between Sturgeon County and Fort Saskatchewan daily (a 50% increase since 2009), and there have also been several fatal collisions in recent years. On March 23, 2017, the provincial NDP government announced that the bridge spanning the North Saskatchewan River connecting Sturgeon County to Fort Saskatchewan would be twinned. A second project would also see the remainder of the Fort Saskatchewan-Edmonton portion twinned. The twinning of the highway (Project A) was completed for the projected completion date, in the fall of 2019, while work is underway on construction of the new bridge, as well as a pedestrian bridge underneath it (Project B). The new bridge is expected to open in 2022, to be utilized by traffic inbound to Fort Saskatchewan; outbound traffic will use the existing bridge.

Manning Drive

Manning Drive is still under development. With the majority of its intersections at-grade, it retains its arterial road status. It was named in 1972 after Ernest Manning, the premier of Alberta from 1943 to 1968.

It has formed as an alternative highway to the historic Fort Road, which was a major route connecting Edmonton and Fort Saskatchewan. Fort Road has since been destroyed in places to make room for development, and the drive was renamed from Manning Freeway although some old signs still remain.

Major intersections

Highway 15
Starting from the west end of Highway 15:

Manning Drive 
Starting from the south end of Manning Drive.

Notes

See also 

 Transportation in Edmonton

References 

015
Fort Saskatchewan
Roads in Edmonton
Roads in Strathcona County